The Men's 50 kilometer classical at the FIS Nordic World Ski Championships 2013 was held on 3 March 2013.[1]

Results
The race was started at 12:30.

References

FIS Nordic World Ski Championships 2013